Acilepidopsis is a monotypic genus in the family Asteraceae. It contains only the species Acilepidopsis echtifolia and can be found in South America.

References

Monotypic Asteraceae genera
Vernonieae